The 2013 Laghman earthquake occurred with magnitude of 5.6, with an epicenter 11 km (seven miles) from Mihtarlam, the capital of Afghanistan's eastern province of Laghman Province near Jalalabad at 09:25 UTC on April 24. The quake occurred below the surface at a moderate depth of 63.8 km. The tremors were also felt in neighboring Pakistan and India.

Earthquake tremors were felt across Pakistan including in Parachinar, Mohmad Agency, Shabqadar, Swat, Peshawar, Islamabad, Chiniot and Lahore.

Damage and casualties
Nangarhar Province: 17 dead, 126 injured, 300 homes damaged
Kunar Province: 1 dead, 4 injured, 45 homes damaged

See also
 List of earthquakes in 2013
 List of earthquakes in Afghanistan

References

External links

2013 earthquakes
2013 disasters in Pakistan
April 2013 events in Afghanistan
April 2013 events in Iran
April 2013 events in Pakistan
Earthquakes in Afghanistan
Earthquakes in Pakistan
Earthquakes in Iran
Earthquake